Fernando da Guerra (c. 1390 – 26 September 1467) was a Portuguese ecclesiastic. He was successively bishop of Algarve (1409–1414), bishop of Porto (1416–1417) and finally archbishop of Braga (1417–1467).

He built the Braga's Archiepiscopal Court, containing the Medieval Hall and library.

References and notes

1390 births
1467 deaths
14th-century Portuguese people
15th-century Portuguese people
Bishops of Porto